Leptosiaphos dewittei, also known commonly as De Witte's five-toed skink, De Witte's leaf-litter skink, and Witte's five-toed skink, is a species of lizard in the family Scincidae. The species is indigenous to Central Africa.

Etymology
The specific name, dewittei, is in honor of Belgian herpetologist Gaston-François de Witte.

Geographic range
L. dewittei is found in Angola and the Democratic Republic of the Congo.

Reproduction
L. dewittei is oviparous.

References

Further reading
Loveridge A (1934). "A New Name for Lygosoma (Siaphos) compressicauda of the Congo, Preoccupied". Copeia 1934 (4): 184. (Siaphos dewittei, new name).

Leptosiaphos
Reptiles described in 1934
Taxa named by Arthur Loveridge